Ruessei Kraok is a khum (commune) of Mongkol Borei District in Banteay Meanchey Province in western Cambodia.

Villages

 Anhchanh
 Neang Ket
 Praek Ropou
 Sala Daeng
 Samraong
 Anlong Mean Trop
 Chamkar Ta Daok
 Pralay Luong Kraom
 Luong
 Ou Ta Kol
 Pralay Luong Leu
 Kouk Svay
 Ou Ta Ma
 Kaoh Kaev
 Phasi Sra
 Ruessei Kraom
 Chumteav

References

Communes of Banteay Meanchey province
Mongkol Borey District